The 2016–17 FC Anzhi Makhachkala season was the club's second season back in the Russian Premier League, the highest tier of football in Russia, since their relegation at the end of the  2013–14 season. Anzhi finished the season in twelfth, narrowly avoiding a Relegation play-off thanks to their head-to-head record against FC Orenburg, whilst also reaching the Quarterfinals of the Russian Cup, where they were knocked out by FC Ufa.

Season events
Pavel Vrba was appointed as the club's new manager on 30 June 2016, following the expiration of Ruslan Agalarov's contract on 31 May 2016.

On 28 December 2016, Suleyman Kerimov sold the club to Osman Kadiyev. Two days later Pavel Vrba left by mutual consent, with Aleksandr Grigoryan being appointed as the club's new manager on 5 January 2017.

Squad
, according to the RFPL official website

On loan

Youth squad

Transfers

Summer

In:

Out:

Winter

In:

Out:

Trialists:

Friendlies

Competitions

Russian Premier League

Results by round

Results

League table

Russian Cup

Squad statistics

Appearances and goals

|-
|colspan="14"|Players away from the club on loan:

|-
|colspan="14"|Players who appeared for Anzhi Makhachkala no longer at the club:

|}

Goal scorers

Disciplinary record

References

External links
Official website
Fans' website 
A fan is a club Anji

FC Anzhi Makhachkala seasons
Anzhi Makhachkala